O Negative is a 2015 Canadian short horror film, directed by Steven McCarthy. The film stars McCarthy as an unnamed man looking for a motel with his vampire girlfriend (Alyx Melone) in order to feed her addiction to human blood.

The film premiered at the 2015 Toronto International Film Festival. In December 2015, the film was named to TIFF's annual year-end Canada's Top Ten list for short films.

References

External links

2015 short films
Canadian horror short films
Canadian vampire films
2010s English-language films
2010s Canadian films